Ekaterina Svirina is a Russian former ice dancer. She is the 1993 World Junior champion with Sergei Sakhnovski. With later partner Vladimir Leliukh, she is the 1996 Nebelhorn Trophy champion.

Results

With Sakhnovski

With Leliukh

References

Navigation

Russian female ice dancers
Living people
World Junior Figure Skating Championships medalists
Goodwill Games medalists in figure skating
Year of birth missing (living people)
Competitors at the 1994 Goodwill Games